Brigadier Alastair "Jock" Stevenson Pearson,  (1 June 1915 – 29 March 1996) was a baker, farmer and one of the most highly regarded soldiers of the Parachute Regiment and the British Army who served in the Second World War.

Early life
Pearson was born in Glasgow, Scotland, on 1 June 1915. He was educated at Kelvinside Academy. After leaving school, he worked as a baker and enlisted in the Territorial Army. He joined the 6th Battalion of the Highland Light Infantry, based in Yorkhill, and part of the 157th Infantry Brigade, 52nd (Lowland) Infantry Division, which was fully mobilised in 1939.

Second World War
Pearson was attached to the South Lancashire Regiment and served briefly in France during January 1940. On 8 June 1940, after the end of Operation Dynamo, he returned to France with the 6th Highland Light Infantry. He fought in the Battle of France with the Second British Expeditionary Force. He was evacuated on 17 June as part of Operation Aerial.

On its return to the United Kingdom, the 52nd (Lowland) Infantry Division was assigned to defend the coast. In 1942 Pearson volunteered to join the British Army's airborne forces and on 1 August he joined the Parachute Regiment, part of the Army Air Corps. He was promoted to the rank of major and served as second-in-command of 2nd Battalion, part of 1st Parachute Brigade. Within a fortnight, Pearson was transferred to 1st Battalion by the commander, Eric Down. Pearson was promptly demoted by Down after a riotous night on the town. He was then promoted to the rank of major for the second time before becoming second-in-command of 1st Battalion under James Hill.

In October 1942, the 1st Parachute Brigade was sent to Tunisia to participate in Operation Torch. Pearson assumed command of 1st Battalion when Hill was badly wounded on 23 November. For his actions while under heavy fire, Pearson was awarded the Military Cross. At the age of twenty-seven, Pearson was promoted to lieutenant colonel and given command of the 1st Parachute Battalion. Pearson was awarded the Distinguished Service Order for his actions in late January and early February 1943. He was awarded a second DSO for actions during the Battle of Tamera in March.

Pearson was awarded a third DSO for his contribution to the invasion of Sicily. In July 1943, the 1st Parachute Brigade was assigned to capture Primosole Bridge in Sicily, ahead of Bernard Montgomery's British Eighth Army. Due to high winds, intense flak, and poor flying, less than 20% of the 1,900 men of the brigade landed on target. However, the bridge was captured and Pearson organized a defence. German forces counter-attacked the following day and the paratroopers were forced to withdraw. Pearson helped to recapture the bridge by guiding a battalion of the Durham Light Infantry, part of 151st Brigade, in an attack on the flank of the German infantry holding the bridge. After the Sicilian campaign, Pearson recuperated from an attack of malaria.

During the summer of 1944, the commander of the new 6th Airborne Division, Major-General Richard Nelson Gale gave Pearson command of the division's 8th Parachute Battalion, which was assigned to the 3rd Parachute Brigade. Pearson immediately began preparing the battalion for the Battle of Normandy. On the night of 5 June 1944, the battalion departed England for France. Upon landing, as part of Operation Tonga (the British airborne drops on D-Day), Pearson was shot in the hand but continued to command. The 8th Parachute Battalion went on to destroy several bridges over the River Dives and then take up defensive positions in the Bavent Wood, east of Pegasus Bridge. Pearson was awarded a fourth DSO in February 1945 for his contributions during the Battle of Normandy.

On his return to England in September 1944, Pearson surrendered command of the 8th Parachute Battalion due to ill health: he married the widow of Reginald G S Morgan Weld Smith(who was killed in the Battle of Britain)-Joan M Niven.

Later life
He then resigned his commission to return to his bakery in Glasgow. In 1947, he rejoined the Territorial Army and commanded the 15th (Scottish Volunteer) Parachute Battalion. Later, he gave up the bakery to turn to farming. In 1951, he was made a Deputy Lord-Lieutenant for Glasgow. In 1953 he was promoted to full colonel and in 1967, he was promoted to Brigadier and became Commandant of the Army Cadet Force in Scotland.

In June 1956 Pearson was appointed aide-de-camp to the Queen, a ceremonial post he held until 1961. He was appointed CB on 12 June 1958. He was appointed Deputy Lord Lieutenant of Dunbartonshire in 1975, and Lord Lieutenant in 1979.

Honours and awards
4 May 1943 – The Distinguished Service Order Major (acting Lieutenant-Colonel) Alastair Stevenson Pearsonis (62792) Army Air Corps (Glasgow, W.2):

18 May 1943 – Bar to the Distinguished Service Order: Major (temporary Lieutenant-Colonel) Alastair Stevenson Pearson DSO (62792) Army Air Corps. (Glasgow, W.2):

23 September 1943 Military Cross: Captain (temporary Major) Alastair Stevenson Pearson D.S.O. (62792), Army Air Corps (Glasgow 19):

23 December 1943 Second Bar to the Distinguished Service Order: Major (temporary Lieutenant-Colonel) Alastair Stevenson Pearson, D.S.O., M.C. (62792), Army Air Corps (Glasgow, W.2):

1 February 1945 – Third Bar to the Distinguished Service Order. Major (temporary Lieutenant-Colonel) Alastair Stevenson Pearson, D.S.O., M.C. (62792), Army Air Corps (Devizes):

3 September 1948 – Lieutenant Colonel Alastair Stevenson Pearson is (62792) is awarded Efficiency Medal.

Television appearances
Pearson was the subject of This Is Your Life in October 1961 when he was surprised by Eamonn Andrews at the BBC Television Theatre.

Footnotes

References

External links
British Army Officers 1939−1945
Imperial War Museum Interview

1915 births
1996 deaths
Military personnel from Glasgow
British Army personnel of World War II
Highland Light Infantry officers
British Parachute Regiment officers
Deputy Lieutenants of Dunbartonshire
Lord-Lieutenants of Dunbartonshire
Companions of the Order of the Bath
Officers of the Order of the British Empire
Recipients of the Military Cross
Companions of the Distinguished Service Order
South Lancashire Regiment officers
Army Cadet Force officers
British bakers
Scottish farmers
British Army brigadiers